{{Infobox settlement
| name                     = Sokoto State
| official_name            = 
| image_skyline            = Front of Sokoto Sultan Palce.jpg
| image_alt                = 
| image_caption            = 
| image_flag               = Sokoto State Flag.svg
| flag_alt                 = Flag of Sokoto State
| image_seal               = Seal of Sokoto State.png
| seal_alt                 = Seal of Sokoto State
| nickname                 = Seat of the Caliphate
| image_map                = Nigeria - Sokoto.svg
| map_alt                  = 
| map_caption              = Location of Sokoto State in Nigeria
| coordinates              = 
| coor_pinpoint            = 
| coordinates_footnotes    = 
| subdivision_type         = Country
| subdivision_name         = 
| established_title        = Date created
| established_date         = 3 February 1976
| seat_type                = Capital
| seat                     = Sokoto
| government_footnotes     = 
| governing_body           = Government of Sokoto State
| leader_party             = PDP
| leader_title             = Governor  (List)
| leader_name              = Aminu Waziri Tambuwal
| leader_title1            = 
| leader_name1             = Munir Daniya (PDP)
| leader_title2            = Legislature
| leader_name2             = Sokoto State House of Assembly
| leader_title3            = Senators
| leader_name3             = 
| leader_title4            = Representatives
| leader_name4             = List
| unit_pref                = Metric
| area_footnotes           = 
| area_total_km2           = 25,973
| area_rank                = 16th of 36
| area_note                = 
| elevation_footnotes      = 
| elevation_m              = 
| population_total         = 3,702,676
| population_as_of         = 2006 census
| population_footnotes     = 
| population_density_km2   = auto
| population_rank          = 14th of 36
| population_note          = 
| demographics_type1       = GDP (PPP)
| demographics1_footnotes  = 
| demographics1_title1     = Year
| timezone1                = WAT
| utc_offset1              = +01
| postal_code_type         = postal code
| postal_code              = 840001
| area_code                = 
| area_code_type           = 
| iso_code                 = NG-SO
| blank_name_sec1          = HDI (2018)
| blank_info_sec1          = 0.339 · 36th of 37
| website                  = 
| footnotes                = 
| type                     = State
| demographics1_info1      = 2007
| demographics1_title2     = Total
| demographics1_info2      = $4.82 billion
| demographics1_title3     = Per capita
| demographics1_info3      = $1,274
}}Sokoto State' (Hausa: Jihar Sokoto; Fula: Leydi Sokoto 𞤤𞤫𞤴𞤣𞤭 𞤧𞤮𞥅𞤳𞤮𞥅𞤼𞤮𞥅) is one of the 36 states of Nigeria, located in the extreme northwest of the country on the national border with the Republic of the Niger. Its capital and largest city is the city of Sokoto. Sokoto is located near to the confluence of the Sokoto River and the Rima River. As of 2005 it has an estimated population of more than 4.2 million.

Being the seat of the former Sokoto Caliphate, the city is predominantly Muslim and an important seat of Islamic learning in Nigeria. The Sultan who heads the caliphate is effectively the spiritual leader of Nigerian Muslims.

 Etymology 
The name Sokoto (which is the modern/anglicised version of the local name, Sakkwato) is of Arabic origin, representing suk, "market". It is also known as Sakkwato, Birnin Shaihu da Bello or "Sokoto, Capital of Shaihu and Bello").

History
Since its creation as a state in 1976 (from the bifurcation of the erstwhile North-Western State (Map) into Sokoto and Niger States, Sokoto state has been ruled by governors, most ex-military officers, who succeeded each another at short intervals.

Sokoto, as a region, knows a longer history. During the reign of the Fulani Empire in the 19th century Sokoto was an important Fula state, in addition to being a city, of what was then west central Nigeria.

From ca. 1900, with the British take-over, Sokoto, which then encompassed the entire north-west corner of Nigeria, became a province of the British protectorate of Nigeria. Not long after Gando was added as a sub-province. It included the then Zamfara and Argungun, or Kebbi, kingdoms.

The following excerpt from the 1911 Encyclopædia Britannica offers some information from the perspective of the occupying British power:

In 1967, not long after Nigeria's independence from the British, the region became known as the Northwestern State. This territory was, in 1976, split into Sokoto State and Niger State. Later on, Kebbi State (1991) and Zamfara State (1996) split off from Sokoto State.

Demographics

Sokoto State is mainly populated by Fulani people. Most Sokoto State residents are Sunni Muslims, with a Shia minority; violence between the two groups is uncommon. Over 80% of people living in the state practice agriculture.
Languages
Hausa and Fulfulde are dominant. The Kainji language Ut-Ma'in is also spoken in Kebbe LGA and the Kainji language Kamuku is also spoken in Sokoto LGA. Minorities speak other languages such as Zarma and Tuareg.

Languages of Sokoto State listed by LGA::

Climate
Sokoto State is in the dry Sahel, surrounded by sandy savannah and isolated hills.

However, maximum daytime temperatures are for most of the year generally under  and the dryness makes the heat bearable. The warmest months are February to April when daytime temperatures can exceed . The rainy season is from June to October during which showers are a daily occurrence. The showers rarely last long and are a far cry from the regular torrential rain known in wet tropical regions. From late October to February, during the cold season'', the climate is dominated by the Harmattan wind blowing Sahara dust over the land. The dust dims the sunlight thereby lowering temperatures significantly and also leading to the inconvenience of dust everywhere in houses.

The region's lifeline for growing crops is the floodplains of the Sokoto-Rima river system (see Sokoto River), which are covered with rich alluvial soil. For the rest, the general dryness of the region allows for few crops, millet perhaps being the most abundant, complemented by rice, corn, other cereals and beans. Apart from tomatoes few vegetables grow in the region.

Cities and villages

Local Government Areas

Sokoto State consists of twenty-three (23) Local Government Areas. They are:

Binji
Bodinga
Dange Shuni
Gada
Goronyo
Gudu
Gwadabawa
Illela
Isa
Kebbe
Kware
Rabah
Sabon Birni
Shagari
Silame
Sokoto North
Sokoto South
Tambuwal
Tangaza
Tureta
Wamako
Wurno
Yabo

Education
Tertiary institutions in Sokoto State are:

 Usman Danfodio University of Sokoto
 Sokoto State University
Umaru Ali Shinkafi Polytechnic Sokoto
 Shehu Shagari College of Education

Politics
The state government is led by a democratically elected governor who works closely with members of the state's house of assembly. The capital city of the state is Sokoto.

Electoral System
The governor of the state is selected using a modified two-round system. To be elected in the first round, a candidate must receive the plurality of votes and over 25% of the vote in at least two-third of the state local government areas. If no candidate passes threshold, a second round will be held between the top candidate and the next candidate to have received a plurality of votes in the highest number of local government areas.

Sources
 Nigeria [map]. Collins Bartholomew Ltd. 2005. Published by Spectrum books Ltd.

References

External links
 www.sokotostate.gov.ng Sokoto State Government Web Site

 
States of Nigeria
States and territories established in 1976